Alejandro Andrés Pol Hurtado (born 29 March 1990) is a Venezuelan footballer playing as midfielder for FK Nevėžis.

Career
Born in Caracas, Alejandro Pol Hurtado had a spell in Spain with RCD Espanyol youth team in 2003–04.

He started his senior career in 2007 playing with Monagas Sport Club playing in the 2007–08 Venezuelan Primera División. In the following season, he moved to Universidad Central de Venezuela FC, usually known as UCV FC or simply Universidad Central.

In 2009, he took his chance again in Europe, this time as a senior, and played with Italian side Ternana Calcio in the 2009–10 Lega Pro Prima Divisione. The following season, he crossed the Adriatic and settled in Serbia where he played with FK Srem in the Serbian First League.

In 2011, he returned to Venezuela, and has been playing back with his former club, Universidad Central. Aside a half-season he spent with Deportivo Petare in the 2012–13 Venezuelan Primera División, he remained with UCV FC from 2011 to 2016.

References

1990 births
Living people
Footballers from Caracas
Venezuelan footballers
Association football midfielders
Expatriate footballers in Spain
Monagas S.C. players
Deportivo Miranda F.C. players
Ternana Calcio players
Expatriate footballers in Italy
FK Srem players
Serbian First League players
Expatriate footballers in Serbia